The 2014-15 season is Burton Albion's sixth consecutive season in League Two. They finished 6th in the previous season but failed to get promotion via the playoffs. It was Gary Rowett's third season as manager of the club, he would leave in November to join Birmingham City. The club would appoint former Chelsea striker Jimmy Floyd Hasselbaink and under his leadership the club finished first earning promotion to the Football League One for the first time in the club's history.

Match details

Pre-season

League Two

League table

Results summary

Results by round

Matches
The fixtures for the 2014–15 season were announced on 18 June 2014 at 9am.

FA Cup

The draw for the first round of the FA Cup was made on 27 October 2014.

League Cup

The draw for the first round was made on 17 June 2014 at 10am. Burton Albion were drawn at home to Wigan Athletic.

Football League Trophy

Transfers

References

External links 
 

Burton Albion F.C. seasons
Burton Albion